This page is a list of place names in Scotland which have subsequently been applied to other parts of the world by Scottish emigrants or explorers, or contain distinctive Scottish surnames as an element.

Antarctica

 Ailsa Craig (South Orkney Islands)
 Anderson Peninsula
 Dundee Island and Firth of Tay
 Inverleith Harbour
 McDonald Ice Rumples
 McMurdo Sound, McMurdo Ice Shelf and McMurdo Station
 McIntyre Island
 MacKenzie Bay
 Mount Campbell
 Mount Crawford (Antarctica)
 Mount Dalrymple
 Mount Douglas (Antarctica)
 Mount Hamilton (Antarctica)
 Mount Inverleith
 Mount Kirkpatrick/Kilpatrick and Kirkpatrick Basalt (named for a Glasgow businessman)
 Mount Strathcona
 Robertson Island
 Robertson Islands
 Scotia Arc and Scotia Sea
 South Orkneys
 Cape Geddes
 Laurie Island (named by Scottish National Antarctic Expedition)
 Nigg Rock 
 Orcadas Base
 Omond House 
 Scotia Bay
 South Shetlands
 Barclay Bay
 Duff Point
 Gibbs Island
 Livingston Island, McFarlane Strait (Livingston)
 McFarlane Strait
 Morton Strait
 South Shetland Trough

Argentina

 Armstrong, Santa Fe
 Drysdale, Buenos Aires - a settlement in Carlos Tejador Partido, Argentina
 Henderson, Buenos Aires
 Munro, Buenos Aires (Duncan Mackay Munro)
 Nueva Escocia - Spanish for New Scotland

Australia

New South Wales
Ben Lomond
Glen Innes
Dalgety
Northern Territory
MacDonnell Ranges
Queensland
 Aramac (R. R. Mackenzie)
 Ayr
 Brisbane (Thomas Brisbane)
 Esk
 Kilcoy
 Logan City (Patrick Logan)
 Mackay (John Mackay)
 Mitchell (Thomas Mitchell)
Tasmania
Ben Lomond
Suburbs of Hobart-Glenorchy-
Glenorchy and City of Glenorchy
Victoria
Grampians, Victoria
St. Kilda
Dunkeld
Western Australia
Marvel Loch, Western Australia
Perth
Stirling
Stirling Range

Barbados

 Names in Bridgetown, Barbados (not a Scottish name)
Arthurs Seat 
Callendar
Carrington
Inch Marlowe (Inchmarlo)
Montrose
 James Town (King James VI of Scotland)
 Saint James, Barbados

Bermuda

Callan Glen
Hamilton
Hamilton Parish (Note that Hamilton is not in Hamilton Parish)

Bulgaria
 Atolovo (from the Bulgarian transliteration of Atholl and the Slavic toponymic suffix "-ovo")

Canada

Also note that, unless otherwise stated, province names are not Scottish.

Alberta
Banff - named after town in north east Scotland
Calgary - named after Calgary, in Mull
New Brunswick
Perth-Andover
Caledonia Mountain

Nova Scotia - Latin for New
Scotland
Inverness County, Nova Scotia
Victoria County, Nova Scotia
Arisaig
Glendale
Iona
New Glasgow
Sunnybrae
Aberdeen
Halifax
Dundee

For Nova Scotian names in Scottish Gaelic (not necessarily the same as the English versions) see:
Canadian communities with Scottish Gaelic speakers
Scottish Gaelic placenames in Canada. 
A notable example of this phenomenon is Beinn Bhreagh, former home of Alexander Graham Bell.

Ontario
 Eglinton 
 Fergus
 Glencoe
 Hamilton
 Port Elgin
Tobermory
 Wallaceburg (William Wallace)
 Prince Edward Island
 New Glasgow

Chile
 Alejandro Selkirk Island (Juan Fernández Islands, named for Alexander Selkirk)
 Villa Cameron
 Cochrane, Chile
 Gordon Island
 Lennox and Picton - Picton allegedly from "Pict", Lennox from the area north of Glasgow

Dominica

 Scotts Head, Dominica
 Scott's Head Village

England

 Crawford, Lancashire, a hamlet near Rainford
 Scotch Corner
 Scotland Yard (London)
 Telford (named after Scottish engineer)

Falkland Islands

 Douglas

Note: The Falkland Islands derive their English language name from Falkland Sound. This was named for Anthony Cary, 5th Viscount of Falkland, who in turn took his title from Falkland Palace. See also West Falkland and East Falkland, the two main islands. Stanley is a location in Scotland, but the Falkland town is named after Edward Smith-Stanley, 14th Earl of Derby.

Brenton Loch (inlet) and Loch Head Pond are also rare examples of the Scottish word "loch" being applied to bodies of water outside Europe.

Hong Kong

Aberdeen Harbour
Aberdeen Street
Arbuthnot Road
Argyle Street
Arran Street
Berwick Street
Braemar Hill
Bute Street
Dumbarton Road
Dunbar Road
Dundas Street
Edinburgh Place
Elgin Street
Fife Street
Forfar Road
Gullane Road
Grampian Road
Inverness Road
Jardine's Lookout (William Jardine)
Lomond Road
Moray Road
Pentland Street
Perth Street
Piper's Hill
Renfrew Road
Selkirk Road
Stirling Road
Sutherland Street
Tweed Street
Zetland Street

India
 Port Blair (Andaman Islands, named after Archibald Blair)
 McLeod Ganj was named after Sir Donald Friell McLeod, a Lieutenant Governor of Punjab
 Dalhousie, India, a town in Himachal Pradesh, named after Lord Dalhousie (1st Marquess of Dalhousie), Governor-General of India (1848–1856)

Italy
 Sant'Andrea degli Scozzesi

Indonesia
Jawa Timur (East Java)
Glenmore (:fr:Glenmore (Indonésie), :id:Glenmore, Banyuwangi) - From a Gaelic placename both in Mull and Lismore, it was named by Scottish Highland soldiers serving in the Dutch East India Company of the 18th Century who were garrisoned in the area near Mount Raung and who eventually married locally and settled down.

Ireland
Because Scotland and Ireland have their own Gaelic languages, many of the same placename elements can be found in both countries. However, during the Ulster Plantations, Scottish settlers from the Lowlands who were mostly of Anglo-Saxon stock have left their mark with some place names in Ulster which are distinct to Ireland's predominantly Celtic placenames.
Bridge End (Donegal)
Burnfoot (Donegal)
Burt (Donegal)
 Caledon, County Tyrone from Caledonia 
 Crawfordsburn (Down)
Drumcairn (Donegal)
Inch (Donegal)
 Scotch Quay (Waterford)
 St. Johnston (Donegal)
Manorcunningham (Donegal)
Newtown Cunningham (Donegal)
 Newtownstewart (Lislas)
 Stewartstown (an Chraobh)

Jamaica
 Aberdeen
 Alva
 Berwick Castle
 Clydesdale
 Culloden (two places)
 Dundee
 Elderslie
 Elgin Town (two places)
 Farquhar's Beach
 Glasgow
 Inverness
 Kilmarnoch (sic - from Kilmarnock)
 Suburbs of Kingston (possibly not itself a Scottish name) 
 Balmagie
 Braeton
 Dunrobin
 Pitcairn Valley
 Portmore
 Sterling Castle (Stirling Castle)
 Knapdale
 Montego Bay suburbs include Dunbar Pen and Glendevon.
 Perth Town
 Roxborough
 Stewart Town
 Tweedside

Kerguelen Islands
 McMurdo Island/Ile McMurdo
 Ile Murray

Malawi
 Blantyre
 Cape Maclear

Malaysia

 Darvel Bay
 Cameron Highlands
 Fraser's Hill
 Port Dickson
 Kinta Kellas, Batu Gajah

Isle of Man
 Atholl Street (financial district of Douglas. Douglas while also a Scottish name, is not of Scottish origin in this case)
 St Ninian's Crossroads (Saint Ninian)

The Isle of Man like Ireland also has its own Gaelic language meaning that Scottish placename elements such as "glen" (Manx: "glione") frequently turn up there, e.g. Sulby Glen, but these are indigenous.

New Caledonia

New Caledonia

New Zealand

North Island
Hamilton, New Zealand
Napier, New Zealand
South Island and Stewart Island/Rakiura
Balclutha - from the Gaelic for 'Clydetown' (Baile Chluaidh)
Dunedin, from Dun Eideann, Scottish Gaelic for Edinburgh
Lammerlaw Range (mountains)
The Grampians (mountains)
Oban, largest settlement in Stewart Island/Rakiura
Ulva Island
Water of Leith (river)

The South Island also contains the Strath-Taieri and the Ben Ohau Range of mountains, both combining Scots Gaelic and Māori origins. Invercargill has the appearance of a Scottish name, since it combines the Scottish prefix "Inver" (Inbhir), meaning a river's mouth, with "Cargill", the name of a leading early settler, who was born in Scotland. Invercargill's main streets are named after Scottish rivers (Dee, Tay, Spey, Esk, Don, Doon, Clyde, etc.), and many places in Dunedin have names mirroring those in Edinburgh. Inchbonnie is a hybrid of Lowland Scots and Scottish Gaelic

Norway
 Hjeltefjorden, meaning "Shetland Fjord"

Panama

Due to the Darién scheme, the Caribbean coast of Panama has various names which refer to the Scottish presence. The colony was called "New Caledonia", the settlement "New Edinburgh", the fort "Fort St Andrew" and the bay near it "Caledonia Bay". These names are defunct, although references to the Scottish settlers remain in some of the Spanish language names of the region.

Pitcairn Islands
Pitcairn
Henderson Island (Scottish surname)

Seychelles
 Farquhar Group and Farquhar Atoll

South Africa

Eastern Cape
Aberdeen
Albany, South Africa (named after Albany, New York, in turn from an old name for Scotland, Alba)
Cathcart (George Cathcart)
Grahamstown (John Graham (British Army officer))
KwaZulu-Natal (native)
Balgowan
Dundee
Glencoe
Scottburgh
Gauteng (native)
 Suburbs of Johannesburg 
 Abbotsford
 Argyll
 Balmoral
 Birnam
 Blairgowrie
 Brushwood Haugh (Haugh being a Lowland Scots word for meadow)
 Buccleuch
 Dunkeld
 Dunnotar
 Dunvegan
 Glen Atholl
 Glen Esk
 Heriotdale
 Kelvin
 Melrose
 Moffat View
 Strathavon
 Wattville
Mpumalanga
Balfour (formerly "McHattiesburg")
North West Province
Orkney
Northern Cape
Alexander Bay (James Edward Alexander)
Campbell
Sutherland
Western Cape
 Arniston (Arniston, Midlothian)
 Clanwilliam
 Elgin
 Gordon's Bay
 McGregor
Napier
 Pringle Bay
 Robertson (Rev William Robertson)
 Suburbs of Cape Town 
 Airlie
 Balvenie
 Bellville (after Charles Davidson Bell, Surveyor-General of the Cape from 1848 to 1872)
 Bonnie Brook (Burn is the normal form in Scotland)
 Clunie 
 Crawford
 Crofters' Valley
 Dunoon
 Dunrobin
 Glencairn
 Kelvingrove
 Lochiel
 Schotsche Kloof - Afrikaans for "Scottish Ravine".
 St Kilda
 The Glen
 Finlay's Point
 Murray's Bay, on Robbin Island, named after John Murray, a Scottish whaler

South Georgia

Allardyce Range
Geikie Glacier (Archibald Geikie)
Leith Harbour (former whaling base)
Lyell Glacier, South Georgia (Charles Lyell)
McNish Island (Harry McNish)
Mount Carse
Mount Cunningham (John C. Cunningham)
Ross Glacier
St Andrews Bay
Stromness and Stromness Bay
Scotia Arc
Scotia Sea

Sri Lanka

Aberdeen Falls
Balmoral
Caledonia
Dalhousie
Elgin Falls
Glasgow
Highland
Iona
Macduff
Maitland Crescent
St. Andrew's
Sanquhar

Sweden

Inverness, a residential area in Danderyd Municipality, Stockholm

Tristan da Cunha

Edinburgh of the Seven Seas

Trinidad and Tobago
[Glencoe] (Suburb of Port of Spain)
 Caledonia Island and Craig Island (joined by a reef)
Culloden Bay
Mount Irvine
Roxburgh
Speyside

Turks and Caicos Islands
 Cockburn Harbour (South Caicos)

United States

Vanuatu
New Hebrides

Wales
Butetown ("Tiger Bay"), in Cardiff (named after the Marquess of Bute)
Wattstown (Cwtch)

Zambia

 Livingstone, Zambia (David Livingstone)

Zimbabwe
 Bannockburn
 Craigmore, Zimbabwe
 Glendale, Zimbabwe
 West Nicholson
 Bulawayo is a native name, but 38 of the 156 suburbs have names of some kind of Scottish origin.
 Barbourfields 
 Burnside
 Douglasdale
 Glencoe 
 Glengarry 
 Kelvin, Kelvin East, Kelvin North and Kelvin West  (River Kelvin)
 Lochview - in reference to Lakeside Dam.
 Montrose Old Church 
 Morningside 
 Paddonhurst 
 Southdale (Shetland Islands). 
 Harare also a native name - suburbs include 
 Ardbennie
 Braeside
 Glen Lorne
 Lochinvar
 Strathaven

Some post-colonial renaming has taken place, e.g. Lake Chivero was formerly known as Lake McIlwaine. It is uncertain whether the "Glen" of Glen Norah is Scottish inspired.

Outer space 

 The Moon
 Dorsa Geikie, a wrinkle ridge system on the Moon, is named after Sir Archibald Geikie.
 Europa
 Arran Chaos
 Callanish
 Tormsdale (Tormsdale, Caithness)
 Martian craters
 Ayr
 Balvicar
 Banff
 Darvel
 Doon
 Echt
 253 Mathilde (asteroid)
 Clackmannan
 243 Ida (asteroid)
 Fingal (features are named after caves, in this case Fingal's Cave on Staffa)

References

External links
Scottish placenames around the world

Lists of place names